Donna Jean Brogan (born July 12, 1939) is an American statistician and professor emeritus of statistics at Emory University. Brogan has worked in biostatistical research in the areas of women's health, mental health and psychosocial health statistics, statistics on breast cancer, and analysis of complex survey data.

Early life and education 
Brogan was born July 12, 1939 and grew up in a working-class neighborhood in Baltimore, Maryland, and she was the first in her family to go to college. She earned a B.A. in mathematics from Gettysburg College in 1960, an M.S. in statistics from Purdue University in 1962. She earned a PhD in statistics from Iowa State University in 1967, under the supervision of Joseph Sendransk.

Work 
In 1971, Brogan founded the Caucus for Women in Statistics, and helped to establish the standing ASA Committee on Women in Statistics.

For four years, she was an assistant professor in the University of North Carolina in the School of Public Health, with a specialization in sample survey design and analysis. Then in 1970, she joined the Emory University School of Medicine as associate professor, later professor in the Department of Statistics and Biometry. Between 1991–1994, she was the Division Director of Biostatistics at Emory. She retired in 2004 from Emory University.

Since 1975, she has worked in freelance and active as a biostatistician, primarily in the specialty area of design and analysis of complex sample surveys.

Personal life 
As a woman in mathematics in the 1950s and 1960s, she suffered from many incidents of sex discrimination, including issues with unequal compensation from the University of North Carolina Chapel Hill and Emory University, as well as a legal battle with the DeKalb County voter registrar, which involved the American Civil Liberties Union.

Brogan and Ruhl later divorced, and Brogan lived as a single mother for several years.

Awards and honors 
She is a Fellow of the American Statistical Association, received the Emory University Thomas Jefferson Award from Emory University  in 1993, and was awarded the Iowa State University Distinguished Alumni Award in 2002. In 1995, Iowa State University engraved her name on its Plaza of Heroines, which honors outstanding women graduates and faculty.

The "Donna J. Brogan Lecture in Biostatistics" was established in 2004 at Emory University, to honor Brogan's work at the school.

Bibliography 

 Gayle S Biehler, G Gorgon Brown, Rick L Williams, Donna Brogan. "Estimating Model-Adjusted Risks, Risk Differences, and Risk Ratios From Complex Survey Data." American Journal of Epidemiology. 171(5), 2010. 
 Sherryl H Goodman, Donna Brogan, Mary Ellen Lynch and Brook Fielding. "Social and Emotional Competence in Children of Depressed Mothers." Child Development. 64(2), 1993. 
 Cecil Slome, Donna Brogan, Sandra Eyres, and Wayne Lednar. "Basic Epidemiological Methods and Biostatistics:  a Workbook." 1982. Wadsworth, Belmont, Cal.

References

External links 

 Emory University faculty profile
 CHANCE Magazine profile

1939 births
Living people
American statisticians
Purdue University alumni
Iowa State University alumni
Fellows of the American Statistical Association
Gettysburg College alumni
Emory University faculty
Women statisticians